Newport, Virginia may refer to several places:
Newport, Augusta County, Virginia, an unincorporated community in Augusta County
Newport, Giles County, Virginia, an unincorporated community in Giles County
Newport, Page County, Virginia, an unincorporated community in Page County

See also
Newport (disambiguation)
Newport News, Virginia, an independent city located in southeastern Virginia in the Hampton Roads region